

Legend

List

References

2020-21